Glyn  means "Valley" in Welsh and may refer to:

Glyn (name), including a list of people with the name
Baron Glyn, a title in the Peerage of the United Kingdom
Glyn baronets, created for members of the Glyn family
Glyn Ceiriog, a former slate mining village in Wrexham County Borough, in Wales
Glyn Technology School, an English boys' school in Epsom and Ewell
Glyn Valley Tramway, a narrow gauge railway between Chirk and Glyn Ceiriog in Denbighshire, Wales
Mynydd y Glyn, a mountain in South Wales, between the towns of Pontypridd and Tonyrefail
An electoral ward in the community of Llanelli Rural in Carmarthenshire, Wales
An electoral ward in the community of Colwyn Bay in Conwy, Wales

See also
Glynn (disambiguation)
Glynne (disambiguation)
Glinn (disambiguation)
Glenn (disambiguation)